The word Grackel can refer to different things

A noseband used in equestrianism.
A spelling variation of Grackle, a bird genus native to North America.